The Sabre modèle An IX, ("sabre, an IX model") was a standard cavalry sabre in usage in the French Army during the Napoleonic Wars.

The modèle An IX was the first attempt at standardising cavalry sabres after the French Revolution, during which a disorganised plethora of bladed weapons was produced. It comes as a successor of the sabre of the elite Garde du Corps.

Sources and references 

Weapons of France
Sabres
Modern European swords